Susy Lineth Cassinova Herrera (born 5 February 1996) is a Panamanian footballer who plays as a forward for Costa Rican club SUVA Sports and the Panama women's national team.

International career
Cassinova has appeared for the Panama women's national team, including in the 2020 CONCACAF Women's Olympic Qualifying Championship on 3 February 2020. She came on as a substitute in the 50th minute for Amarelis De Mera in the match against Haiti.

See also
 List of Panama women's international footballers

References

External links
 

1996 births
Living people
Panamanian women's footballers
Women's association football forwards
Panama women's international footballers
Panamanian expatriate women's footballers
Panamanian expatriate sportspeople in Costa Rica
Expatriate women's footballers in Costa Rica